The Kubitzki system is a system of plant taxonomy devised by Klaus Kubitzki, and is the product of an ongoing survey of vascular plants, entitled The Families and Genera of Vascular Plants, and extending to 15 volumes in 2018. The survey, in the form of an encyclopedia, is important as a comprehensive, multivolume treatment of the vascular plants, with keys to and descriptions of all families and genera, mostly by specialists in those groups. The Kubitzki system served as the basis for classification in Mabberley's Plant-Book, a dictionary of the vascular plants. Mabberley states, in his Introduction on page xi of the 2008 edition, that the Kubitzki system "has remained the standard to which other literature is compared".

In ordinal and family arrangements, the classification system in the initial angiosperm volumes closely resembles the Dahlgren system in Monocots and the Cronquist system in Dicots, but later volumes have been influenced by recent molecular phylogenetic studies.

The first volume of the series (Pteridophytes and Gymnosperms) covered lycophytes, monilophytes, and gymnosperms, and was published in 1990. By 2010, there were nine published volumes, covering 39 of the 59 orders of flowering plants that are recognized in the APG III system. The order Saxifragales is covered except for the genus Medusandra, which was transferred to it from Malpighiales in 2009. Volume 10 (2011) covers the family Myrtaceae and the orders Cucurbitales and Sapindales. Volume 11 was published in 2014, and two further volumes in 2015. Volumes 2, and 5–7 address dicotyledons, while volumes 3, 4 and 13 address monocotyledons. Volumes 8–12 and 14 deal with eudicots.

Because it is the result of a work in progress, the Kubitzki system is incomplete for those groups of plants that have not yet been covered, and groups that have been completely covered are not revised in light of subsequent knowledge. Since the first volume was published in 1990, a great deal has been learned about plant taxonomy, mostly by phylogenetic analysis of DNA sequences. The classification of ferns has been completely overhauled in that time. And some of the gymnosperm families have been revised.

For the flowering plants, the later volumes of the Kubitzki System follows the Angiosperm Phylogeny Group last revised in 2009 (APG III system), except for the recognition of smaller families. (For a complete listing of all volumes, see Klaus Kubitzki)

Classification

Summary 
Divisions
 Pteridophyta
 Pinophyta
 subdivision Coniferophytina
 subdivision Cycadophytina
 Magnoliophyta
 class Monocotyledoneae
 class  Dicotyledoneae

Pteridophyta 
 1 division Pteridophyta
 1 class Psilotatae
 Psilotaceae
 2 class Lycopodiatae
 Isoetaceae
 Lycopodiaceae
 Selaginellaceae
 3 class Equisetatae
 Equisetaceae
 4 class Filicatae
 Aspleniaceae
 Azollaceae
 Blechnaceae
 Cheiropleuriaceae
 Cyatheaceae
 Davalliaceae
 Dennstaedtiaceae
 Dicksoniaceae
 Dipteridaceae
 Dryopteridaceae
 Gleicheniaceae
 Grammitidaceae
 Hymenophyllaceae
 Hymenophyllopsidaceae
 Lomariopsidaceae
 Lophosoriaceae
 Loxsomataceae
 Marattiaceae
 Marsileaceae
 Matoniaceae
 Metaxyaceae
 Monachosoraceae
 Nephrolepidaceae
 Oleandraceae
 Ophioglossaceae
 Osmundaceae
 Plagiogyriaceae
 Polypodiaceae
 Pteridaceae
 Salviniaceae
 Schizaeaceae
 Thelypteridaceae
 Vittariaceae

Pinophyta 
 2 division Pinophyta or Gymnospermae
1 subdivision Coniferophytina
 1 class Ginkgoatae
 Ginkgoaceae
 2 class Pinatae
 1 order Pinales
 Araucariaceae
 Pinaceae
 Sciadopityaceae
 Taxodiaceae
 Cupressaceae
 Phyllocladaceae
 Podocarpaceae
 2 order Taxales
 Cephalotaxaceae
 Taxaceae
2 subdivision Cycadophytina
 1 class Cycadatae
 order Cycadales 
 Boweniaceae
 Cycadaceae
 Stangeriaceae
 Zamiaceae
 2 class Gnetatae
 order Gnetales 
 Ephedraceae
 Welwitschiaceae
 Gnetaceae

Magnoliophyta 
 3 division Magnoliophyta or Angiospermae
 subdivision Magnoliophytina

Monocotyledoneae 
1 class Monocotyledoneae or Liliopsida [complete] (with Rolf Dahlgren's collaboration)
4 Superorders
 Acoranae
 Alismatanae
 Lilianae
 Commelinanae

Acoranae 
1 superorder Acoranae
 Acoraceae
 Not included in any order
 Nartheciaceae

Alismatanae 
2 superorder Alismatanae
1 order Arales
 Araceae
 Lemnaceae
2 order Alismatales
 Butomaceae
 Alismataceae
 Limnocharitaceae
 Hydrocharitaceae
 Najadaceae
 Aponogetonaceae
 Scheuchzeriaceae
 Juncaginaceae
 Potamogetonaceae
 Ruppiaceae
 Posidoniaceae
 Zosteraceae
 Zannichelliaceae
 Cymodoceaceae

Lilianae 
3 superorder Lilianae
1 order Liliales
 Campynemataceae
 Luzuriagaceae
 Alstroemeriaceae
 Colchicaceae
 Melanthiaceae
 Trilliaceae
 Liliaceae
 Calochortaceae
 Petermanniaceae
 Smilacaceae
 Philesiaceae
2 order Asparagales
 Orchidaceae
 Iridaceae
 Doryanthaceae
 Lanariaceae
 Ixioliriaceae
 Hypoxidaceae
 Johnsoniaceae
 Hemerocallidaceae
 Tecophilaeaceae
 Blandfordiaceae
 Asteliaceae
 Boryaceae
 Asphodelaceae
 Xanthorrhoeaceae
 Aphyllanthaceae
 Anemarrhenaceae
 Amaryllidaceae
 Agapanthaceae
 Alliaceae
 Themidaceae
 Asparagaceae
 Hyacinthaceae
 Lomandraceae
 Herreriaceae
 Hostaceae
 Anthericaceae
 Agavaceae
 Eriospermaceae
 Ruscaceae
 Behniaceae
 Dracaenaceae
 Convallariaceae
 Nolinaceae
3 order Triuridales
 Triuridaceae
4 order Dioscoreales
 Dioscoreaceae
 Trichopodaceae
 Taccaceae
 Burmanniaceae
 Corsiaceae
5 order Pandanales
 Pandanaceae
 Cyclanthaceae
 Velloziaceae
 Acanthochlamydaceae
 Stemonaceae
 Pentastemonaceae

Commelinanae 
4 superorder Commelinanae
1 order Principes
 Palmae
2 order Dasypogonales
 Dasypogonaceae
3 order Bromeliales
 Bromeliaceae
 ?Rapateaceae (see also Xyridales)
4 order Commelinales
 Commelinaceae
 Pontederiaceae
 Philydraceae
 Haemodoraceae
5 order Xyridales
 Mayacaceae
 Xyridaceae
 Eriocaulaceae
 ?Rapateaceae
6 order Zingiberales
 Musaceae
 Strelitziaceae
 Lowiaceae
 Heliconiaceae
 Costaceae
 Zingiberaceae
 Cannaceae
 Marantaceae
 ?Hanguanaceae (possibly related to Zingiberales or Commelinales)
7 order Typhales
 Typhaceae
8 order Juncales
 Juncaceae
 Thurniaceae
 Cyperaceae
9 order Poales
 Flagellariaceae
 Restionaceae
 Ecdeiocoleaceae
 Anarthriaceae
 Centrolepidaceae
 Joinvilleaceae
 Poaceae
 incertae sedis in monocots
 Hydatellaceae

Dicotyledoneae 
2 class Dicotyledoneae or Magnoliopsida [incomplete]
1 subclass Magnoliidae
1 superorder Magnolianae (lower magnoliids)
1 order Magnoliales
 Himantandraceae
 Eupomatiaceae
 Austrobaileyaceae
 Degeneriaceae
 Magnoliaceae
 Annonaceae
 Myristicaceae
 ?Canellaceae
 ?Lactoridaceae
 Amborellaceae
 Trimeniaceae
 Chloranthaceae
 Monimiaceae
 Gomortegaceae
 Lauraceae
 Hernandiaceae
 Calycanthaceae
2 order Illiciales
 Winteraceae
 ?Canellaceae
 Illiciaceae
 Schisandraceae
3 order Aristolochiales
 Aristolochiaceae
 Hydnoraceae
 ?Rafflesiaceae
4 order Piperales
 Saururaceae
 Piperaceae
2 superorder Ranunculanae (higher magnoliids)
1 order Nelumbonales
 Nelumbonaceae
2 order Ranunculales
 Lardizabalaceae
 Berberidaceae
 Menispermaceae
 Ranunculaceae
 ?Circaeasteraceae
 Pteridophyllaceae
 Papaveraceae
 Fumariaceae
3 superorder Nymphaeanae
 order Nymphaeales
 Cabombaceae
 Nymphaeaceae
 ?Ceratophyllaceae
4 superorder Caryophyllanae
 order Caryophyllales (including.:Centrospermae Eichler)
 Family with an asterisk: *, included in Expanded Caryophyllales in Volume V.
 Family with the sign +,  only recognized in Volume V, but not in Volume II.
 Nepenthaceae *
 Droseraceae *
 Drosophyllaceae *
 Simmondsiaceae *
 Rhabdodendraceae *
 Asteropeiaceae *
 Physenaceae *
 Ancistrocladaceae *
 Dioncophyllaceae *
 Frankeniaceae *
 Tamaricaceae *
 clade Centrospermae
 Caryophyllaceae
 Molluginaceae
 Aizoaceae
 Amaranthaceae
 Chenopodiaceae
 Halophytaceae
 Stegnospermaceae
 Achatocarpaceae
 Phytolaccaceae
 Nyctaginaceae
 Cactaceae
 Portulacaceae
 Didiereaceae
 Basellaceae
 Hectorellaceae
 Barbeuiaceae +
 Sarcobataceae +
 Petiveriaceae +
 Agdestidaceae +
5 superorder Hamamelidanae
1 order Trochodendrales
 Trochodendraceae
 Eupteleaceae
 Cercidiphyllaceae
 ?Myrothamnaceae
2 order Hamamelidales
 Platanaceae
 Hamamelidaceae
3 order Fagales
 Fagaceae
 Betulaceae
 Ticodendraceae
4 order Juglandales
 Rhoipteleaceae
 Juglandaceae
 Myricaceae
5 order ?Casuarinales
 Casuarinaceae
6 superorder Polygonanae
 order Polygonales
 Polygonaceae
7 superorder Plumbaginanae
 order Plumbaginales
 Plumbaginaceae
8 superorder Malvanae
 order Malvales
 Neuradaceae
 Tepuianthaceae
 Thymelaeaceae
 Dipterocarpaceae
 Diegodendraceae
 Sphaerosepalaceae
 Cistaceae
 Sarcolaenaceae
 Bixaceae
 Cochlospermaceae
 Muntingiaceae
 Malvaceae

In volumes 5,6,7,8 no groups above the taxonomic rank of order were recognized. 
 order Capparales
 Bataceae
 Salvadoraceae
 Tropaeolaceae
 Limnanthaceae
 Caricaceae
 Moringaceae
 Setchellanthaceae
 Akaniaceae
 Gyrostemonaceae
 Resedaceae
 Pentadiplandraceae
 Tovariaceae
 Koeberliniaceae
 Cruciferae or Brassicaceae
 Capparaceae
 Emblingiaceae
 Not placed in any order, but related to Capparales
 Tapisciaceae
 order Celastrales
 Parnassiaceae
 Lepidobotryaceae
 Celastraceae
 order Oxalidales
 Oxalidaceae
 Connaraceae
 Cephalotaceae
 Brunelliaceae
 Cunoniaceae
 Elaeocarpaceae
 order Rosales (# revised position, formerly in Urticales in Vol. 2)
 Rosaceae (including Guamatela)
 Dirachmaceae
 Rhamnaceae
 Barbeyaceae #
 Elaeagnaceae
 Ulmaceae #
 Moraceae #
 Cecropiaceae (including Cannabaceae) #
 Urticaceae #
 order Cornales
 Hydrostachyaceae
 Curtisiaceae
 Grubbiaceae
 Cornaceae
 Hydrangeaceae
 Loasaceae
 order Ericales
 Theophrastaceae
 Samolaceae
 Maesaceae
 Myrsinaceae
 Primulaceae
 Actinidiaceae
 Balsaminaceae
 Marcgraviaceae
 Pellicieraceae
 Tetrameristaceae
 Ericaceae
 Clethraceae
 Cyrillaceae
 Roridulaceae
 Sarraceniaceae
 Diapensiaceae
 Lissocarpaceae
 Polemoniaceae
 Fouquieriaceae
 Scytopetalaceae
 Lecythidaceae
 Napoleonaeaceae
 Styracaceae
 Ebenaceae
 Sladeniaceae
 Theaceae
 Ternstroemiaceae
 Sapotaceae
 Symplocaceae
 order Lamiales
 Bignoniaceae
 Buddlejaceae
 Byblidaceae
 Callitrichaceae
 Carlemanniaceae
 Cyclocheilaceae
 Gesneriaceae
 Globulariaceae
 Hippuridaceae
 Labiatae
 Lentibulariaceae
 Martyniaceae
 Myoporaceae
 Nesogenaceae
 Oleaceae
 Pedaliaceae
 Phrymaceae
 Plantaginaceae
 Plocospermataceae
 Scrophulariaceae
 Stilbaceae
 Tetrachondraceae
 Trapellaceae
 Verbenaceae
 order Asterales
 Alseuosmiaceae
 Argophyllaceae
 Compositae or Asteraceae
 subfamily Barnadesioideae
 subfamily Mutisioideae
 subfamily Carduoideae
 subfamily Cichorioideae
 subfamily Asteroideae
 Calyceraceae
 Campanulaceae
 Carpodetaceae
 Goodeniaceae
 Menyanthaceae
 Pentaphragmataceae
 Phellinaceae
 Rousseaceae
 Stylidiaceae
In volume 9 the supraordinal groups Rosidae and Asteridae were recognized.
 Not included in any order
 Sabiaceae
 order Proteales
 Proteaceae
 Platanaceae (revised position, formerly in Hamamelidales in Vol. 2)
 Nelumbonales (revised position, formerly in Nelumbonales in Vol. 2)
 order Buxales
 Buxaceae
 Didymelaceae
 order Gunnerales
 Gunneraceae
 Myrothamnaceae (revised position, formerly in Trochodendrales in Vol. 2)
 Not included in any order
 Dilleniaceae
 order Saxifragales
 Altingiaceae (newly recognized family, included in Hamamelidaceae in Vol. 2)
 Aphanopetalaceae
 Cercidiphyllaceae (revised position, formerly in Trochodendrales in Vol. 2)
 Crassulaceae
 Daphniphyllaceae
 Grossulariaceae
 Haloragaceae
 Hamamelidaceae (revised position, formerly in Hamamelidales in Vol. 2)
 Iteaceae
 Paeoniaceae
 Penthoraceae
 Peridiscaceae (except Medusandra)
 Pterostemonaceae
 Saxifragaceae
 Tetracarpaeaceae
 order Vitales
 Leeaceae
 Vitaceae
 order Zygophyllales
 Krameriaceae
 Zygophyllaceae
 Not included in any order
 Huaceae
 order Geraniales
 Geraniaceae
 Ledocarpaceae
 Melianthaceae
 order Crossosomatales (Guamatela placed in Rosaceae in volume 6)
 Aphloiaceae
 Crossosomataceae
 Geissolomataceae
 Ixerbaceae
 Stachyuraceae
 Staphyleaceae
 Strasburgeraceae
 Not included in any order
 Picramniaceae
 order Berberidopsidales
 Aextoxicaceae
 Berberidopsidaceae

In volume 10 are treated the Orders Sapindales and Cucurbitales; and the Myrtaceae Family (belonging to Myrtales).
 order Sapindales
 Biebersteiniaceae
 Nitrariaceae
 Tetradiclidaceae
 Sapindaceae
 Kirkiaceae
 Anacardiaceae
 Burseraceae
 Rutaceae
 Simaroubaceae
 Meliaceae
 order Cucurbitales
 Anisophylleaceae
 Coriariaceae
 Corynocarpaceae
 Cucurbitaceae
 Datiscaceae
 Begoniaceae
 order Myrtales
 Myrtaceae

See also 
 Klaus Kubitzki

References

External links
 Fern Classification At: Publications and Data Sets At: Kathleen Pryer's Lab

system, Kubitzki